Cornwall was an electoral district of the Legislative Assembly of the Parliament of the Province of Canada, in Canada West.  It was based on the town of Cornwall, located on the north shore of the Saint Lawrence River. The electoral district was created in 1841, upon the establishment of the Province of Canada by the merger of Upper Canada and Lower Canada.

Cornwall was represented by one member in the Legislative Assembly.  It was abolished in 1867, upon the creation of Canada and the province of Ontario.

Boundaries 

Cornwall electoral district was based largely on the municipal boundaries of the town of Cornwall, on the north shore of the Saint Lawrence River.  It was located in Canada West (now the province of Ontario), close to the boundary with Canada East (now the province of Quebec).

The Union Act, 1840 had merged the two provinces of Upper Canada and Lower Canada into the Province of Canada, with a single Parliament.  The separate parliaments of Upper Canada and Lower Canada were abolished.Union Act, 1840, 3 & 4 Vict., c. 35, s. 2.  The Union Act provided that the town of Cornwall would constitute one electoral district in the Legislative Assembly of the new Parliament, but gave the Governor General of the Province of Canada the power to draw the boundaries for the electoral district.

The first Governor General of the Province of Canada, Lord Sydenham, issued a proclamation shortly after the formation of the Province of Canada in early 1841, establishing the boundaries for the electoral district:

Members of the Legislative Assembly 

Cornwall was represented by one member in the Legislative Assembly. The following were the members for Cornwall.

Abolition 

The district was abolished on July 1, 1867, when the British North America Act, 1867 came into force, creating Canada and splitting the Province of Canada into Quebec and Ontario.  It was succeeded by electoral districts of the same name in the House of Commons of Canada and the Legislative Assembly of Ontario.

References 

  Electoral districts of Canada West